Joseph R. Marro (March 17, 1907 – February 21, 1989) was an American lawyer and politician from New York.

Life
He was born on March 17, 1907, in New York City. He attended Public School No. 95 and No. 8, and DeWitt Clinton High School. He graduated from St. John's College, and from St. John's University School of Law. He practiced law in New York City. He married Anita Eleanor Aloi, and they had two children.

Marro was a member of the New York State Senate from 1953 to 1964, sitting in the 169th, 170th, 171st, 172nd, 173rd and 174th New York State Legislatures. In November 1964, he was elected to the New York City Civil Court.

He was a justice of the Civil Court from 1965 to 1973; and of the New York Supreme Court from 1974 to 1977.

He died on February 21, 1989, at his home in Manhattan, of heart failure.

Sources

1907 births
1989 deaths
People from Manhattan
Democratic Party New York (state) state senators
St. John's University School of Law alumni
New York Supreme Court Justices
DeWitt Clinton High School alumni
20th-century American judges
20th-century American politicians